The 1990 Open Championship was a men's major golf championship and the 119th Open Championship, held from 19 to 22 July at the Old Course in St Andrews, Scotland. Nick Faldo won the second of his three Open Championships by five strokes over runners-up Mark McNulty and Payne Stewart.
Earlier in the year, Faldo won the Masters; this was the fourth of his six major titles.

Course

Previous lengths of the course for The Open Championship (since 1950):
  - 1984, 1978
  - 1970 
  - 1964 
  - 1960, 1955

Past champions in the field

Made the cut

Source:

Missed the cut

Source:

Round summaries

First round
Thursday, 19 July 1990

Second round
Friday, 20 July 1990

Source:

Amateurs: Nash (+1), Kuramoto (+5), Patton (+5), Muntz (+8).

Third round
Saturday, 21 July 1990

Source:

Final round
Sunday, 22 July 1990

Source:

References

External links
St Andrews 1990 (Official site)
119th Open Championship - St Andrews (European Tour)

The Open Championship
Golf tournaments in Scotland
Open Championship
Open Championship
Open Championship